Johnsons Cleaners UK is a subsidiary of Timpson, based in Wythenshawe, Manchester. Founded in 1817, Johnsons is a provider of specialist dry cleaning, key cutting and photo services across 100 branches in the United Kingdom. 

The origins of the dry cleaning business go back to 1817 when Johnson Brothers started in business in Liverpool as silk dyers.

In 1920, Johnson Brothers joined forces in amalgamation with two dry cleaning companies, Jas Smith & Son and Flinn & Son Ltd of Brighton.
Further expansion of the Group took place over the next sixty years until Johnsons became the largest dry cleaning organisation in the country.

In 1974, they purchased Kneels (Devon and Cornwall's) dry cleaning chain.

At the start of 1980s, larger branches sub let spaces within their stores for concessions, these were mostly either Klick Photopoint or key cutting company "Mister Minit"

In 1985, they were the victim of a hostile take over by their biggest competitor Sketchley, but the takeover bid ultimately failed.

Johnson Cleaners UK Ltd (JCUK) was formed in 1995 when the twelve operating companies, which made up the Johnson Group in the UK at that time, were restructured into just two companies.

In 1997, Klick Photopoint decided to start moving their concessions out of Johnsons and into their own shop premises, initially Johnsons decided to replace Klick with Mister Minit concessions, However they soon changed their mind about this. 
In May 1998, Mister Minit bought Sketchley Dry Cleaners, which then made Mister Minit their main competitor. Following this takeover, Johnsons started kicking Mister Minit out of their branches and replacing them with rival shoe repair company Timpsons.

In 2000, they took over their largest commercial laundry rival Seamara Group (Sketchley's former holding company prior to 1998).

April 2003 Minit UK PLC (owners of Mister Minit and Sketchley) were taken over by Timpsons, by this transaction Johnsons had a new enemy within their branches to contend with, just like in May 1998 when Mister Minit bought Sketchley, but now there was no other rival multiple shoe repair company they could put into their branches to replace Timpsons.

In 2004, they held talks with Morrisons about buying Safeway's Dry Cleaning Business, but when talks failed; they purchased Sketchley (the UK's second-largest dry cleaner) from Timpson instead. The Sketchley shops were rebranded as Johnsons in 2007.

Along with the acquisition of Sketchley, they inherited the Jeeves of Belgravia (London's upmarket dry cleaning) brand.

In 2006, the JSG (Johnson Service Group) decided to put the chain of 550 dry cleaning stores up for sale, they told the media that the retail division accounted for less than 25% of their annual profits and they had decided to concentrate on their commercial laundry, textile rental and work wear businesses instead, but despite some equity groups looking at the retail arms accounts; no bid was ever made for the dry cleaning shops.

In 2010, they launched Green Earth Dry Cleaning Branding across all their shops.

During the summer of 2012, Johnsons announced the closure of over 100 underperforming stores.

In January 2015, they announced the closure of 109 of their 307 remaining branches; the reason given was the 109 shops' leases had come to an end and it would not be viable to renew them. Today the retail division accounts for less than 10% of JSG's (JOHNSON SERVICE GROUP) Annual profits 

In January 2017, the remaining 198 Johnson Cleaners stores, along with Jeeves of Belgravia and Jeeves International, were purchased from Johnson Service Group by competitor Timpsons. 
Since January 2017 the Johnsons store estate has declined to 100 stores approximately  due to the takeover of Morrison's dry cleaning business and existing shop leases not being renewed

References

External links 
 http://www.johnsoncleaners.com/
 
 
 
 

Companies based in Cheshire
Companies based in Liverpool
Service companies of the United Kingdom